Puffinus nestori is an extinct seabird in the petrel family.  Its fossil remains, dating from the late Pliocene to early Pleistocene, were found on the island of Ibiza of the Balearic archipelago in the western Mediterranean.  It was speculated that it was the direct ancestor of the Mediterranean shearwater (now split into Balearic and yelkouan shearwaters).

References

Puffinus
Prehistoric birds of Europe
Fossil taxa described in 1989
Fauna of the Balearic Islands
Birds of Ibiza
Birds described in 1989